Anoplodesmus inornatus, is a species of millipedes in the family Paradoxosomatidae. It is endemic to Sri Lanka, which was first documented from Peradeniya.

References

Polydesmida
Animals described in 1865
Endemic fauna of Sri Lanka
Millipedes of Asia